Matthew Dyktynski is an Australian actor and comedian, graduating from Australia's National Institute of Dramatic Art in 1992.

Dyktinski has played lead roles on television series Shock Jock and Raw FM, and has appeared on The Man from Snowy River, Stingers, Blue Heelers, Water Rats, Halifax f.p., All Saints and The Secret Life of Us. His movie credits include Love and Other Catastrophes (1996), Japanese Story (2003) and Wil (2006), in which he played the title role.

As a comedian, Dyktinski has toured the United Kingdom, Europe and Australia.

External links
 Matthew Dyktynski's home page
 

Living people
Australian male television actors
Australian male comedians
Australian people of Polish descent
Year of birth missing (living people)